Bortianor-Ngleshie-Amanfro is one of the constituencies represented in the Parliament of Ghana. It elects one Member of Parliament (MP) by the first past the post system of election. Bortianor-Ngleshie-Amanfro is located in the Ga South Municipal District of the Greater Accra Region.

Boundaries 
The seat is located within the Ga South Municipal District of the Greater Accra Region of Ghana.

Members of Parliament

Elections

See also 

 List of Ghana Parliament constituencies
 List of political parties in Ghana

References

Parliamentary constituencies in the Greater Accra Region